Sina District is one of five districts of the San Antonio de Putina Province in the Puno Region of Peru.

Geography 
The Apolobamba mountain range traverses the district. Other mountains are listed below:

History 
Sina District was created on May 2, 1854.

Ethnic groups 
The people in the district are mainly indigenous citizens of Quechua descent. Quechua is the language which the majority of the population (80.79%) learnt to speak in childhood, 15.54% of the residents started speaking using the Spanish language (2007 Peru Census).

Mayors 
 2011-2014: Ricardo Flores Hilasaca. 
 2007-2010: Marcial Huanca Mamani.

Festivities 
  Candlemas, the Feast of the Purification of the Virgin.
 Cross of May

References

External links 
 INEI Peru